Felipe Pigna (born 
29 May 1959) is an Argentine historian and writer. He is among the best-selling authors from Argentina.

Biography 
Pigna teaches at the Escuela Superior de Comercio Carlos Pellegrini, directing the Ver la Historia project that produced 13 documentaries covering the 1776–2001 period of the History of Argentina. He is a columnist, appears on radio programs, and contributes to newspapers and magazines such as Noticias, Veintitrés and Todo es Historia. He is the director of Caras y Caretas magazine.

He has served as a history adviser for TV networks such as HBO, People and Arts, Italy's RAI, and Spain's Antena 3. He was a columnist of Historia Confidencial, an Argentine TV show.

Pigna is a CEO and writes for the historically-focused website El Historiador (The Historian). He is often seen in the media talking about historical subjects. He is the host of Vida y Vuelta, a television program of historical documentaries and interviews.

With Mario Pergolini, Pigna wrote, produced and hosted Algo habrán hecho por la historia argentina, a TV show aired in 2005 (and later released in a set of DVDs) which combines documentary, humor and free reenactments of historical events. The show granted him a Martín Fierro award, and in his acceptance speech he dedicated the prize to some of his historical national heroes, namely Mariano Moreno, Juan José Castelli, Manuel Belgrano and Manuel Dorrego.

Style
The works of Felipe Pigna are not aimed to the academic public, but to the masses. To this purpose, he employs slang, plain language, and some humor and references to the reader. He attempts to relate the historical Argentina with modern Argentina, setting parallels between past and modern events or circumstances. He considers that events do not really repeat themselves exactly because circumstances change, but the consequences are likely to be broadly the same, such as wealth gaps leading to authoritarian governments. His works usually describe history as a dispute between the people and the powerful classes, where the latter ones oppressed the population both now and then, and even so people would manage to achieve some victories, even if short-lived.

Historians Tulio Halperín Dongui and Luis Alberto Romero made strong criticism of Pigna's style, and refuse to consider his work as real history books even if Pigna is a professional historian. They consider that his works do not show historiographical culture, general culture or literary talent, and that the works cited in them are misquoted or taken out of context. Pigna uses as a pretext that foreign works accept and acknowledge subjective views, and his aim was to make the history of Argentina easy to understand by all people. Furthermore he insists that an opposing approach to the topic was elitist, revealing a completely lack of objectivity in his writings .

Works 
Some of Pigna's works include:
 Historia. El mundo contemporáneo (2000) .
 Historia. La Argentina contemporánea (2000) .
 Pasado en Presente (2001).
 Historia Confidencial (2003) .
 Los mitos de la historia argentina (2004) .
 The Myths of Argentine History (2005) .
 Los Mitos de la Historia Argentina 2 (2005) .
 Lo pasado pensado (2005)
 Los mitos de la historia argentina 3(2006)
 Historia confidencial, with José Ignacio García Hamilton and Pacho O'Donnell
 1810 – La otra historia de nuestra Revolución fundadora, Editorial Planeta, Buenos Aires 2010 
 Libertadores de América (2010)
 Mujeres tenían que ser (2011)

References

Bibliography

External links 
 Official webpage of Felipe Pigna on El Historiador 
 Felipe Pigna personal site 

21st-century Argentine historians
Argentine male writers
Argentine people of Italian descent
Historians of Latin America
Argentine documentary film directors
People from Mercedes, Buenos Aires
1959 births
Living people
Male non-fiction writers